Daruwane is a 2012 Sri Lankan Sinhala children's family drama film directed by V. Sivadasan and produced by Sunil T. Fernando for Sunil T. Films. It stars Jayalath Manoratne, Janaka Kumbukage, and Duleeka Marapana in lead roles along with Nadeeka Gunasekara and Vishwanath Kodikara. Music composed by Somapala Rathnayake. It is the 1176th Sri Lankan film in the Sinhala cinema. The film is a remake of 2009 Tamil film Pasanga.

Plot
Samarasekara who is a newcomer to village, enrolls his children to a village school. His neighbour, Vajirasena is the class teacher of Samarasekara's son, Rakshita. Rakshita becomes the favourite among other students. Vajirasena's son, Diluka, who is also Rakshita's classmate, gets jealous at him. He has two friends, Nadeeka and Ukkuwa and tries to defeat Rakshita, but in vain. Later, they plan to attack him, but their classmate, Charuni overhears them and confronts them. Unexpectedly, Rakshita meets with an accident and Diluka helps to hospitalize him. In the hospital, Rakshita recovers with the Diluka's courageous. Finally, Diluka realizes his mistakes and befriends with Rakshita.

Cast
 Jayalath Manoratne as Vajirasena Ahangama
 Janaka Kumbukage as Samarasekara
 Duleeka Marapana as Anjula Samarasekara
 Nadeeka Gunasekara as Vishaka Ahangama
 Vishwanath Kodikara as Priyantha 
 Thisuri Yuwanika as Dulani Ahangama
 Wijeratne Warakagoda as Anjula's Father
 Palitha Silva as Doctor

Child Artists
 Shayan Perera as Rakshitha Samarasekara (Ricky)
 Yohan Perera as Diluka Ahangama
 Trishuna Perera as Saman
 Duruthu Abhishek as Kalpa Dissanayake
 Rachini Viranga as Charuni
 Kokila Jayasuriya as Nadeeka
 Chanka Madushan as Ukkuwa

Soundtrack

References

2012 films
2010s Sinhala-language films
Remakes of Sri Lankan films
Sri Lankan drama films
2012 drama films